The Santa Maria Football Club is an amateur Filipino football club, based in Santa Maria, Bulacan. The team lastly competed in the Weekend Futbol League and still competing on local tournaments in their community. The club made its debut as a guest team in the 2014–15 season of the Weekend Futbol League Cup (WFL Cup) competition, a competition sanctioned by the National Capital Region F.A. The name of the football club was derived from the name of the town where the club was founded.

History

Early years
Santa Maria F.C. (SMFC) was established on December 31, 2012, with the vision of being the official football team of the town of Santa Maria, Bulacan. The club was founded by local football fans led by Marvin John Ignacio. The club was formerly known as the Kenyo United Football Club, a play on the word "Bulakenyo," before it was renamed to its current incarnation. The first squad of the club was formed solely by Santa Maria, Bulacan locals. The club expanded its roster, with some players coming from Metro Manila.

Weekend Futbol League Cup Competition 2014–15
SMFC solidified its football roots during its entry in the 2014 season of the WFL Cup. The club was drawn last, with the British School Manila Leons F.C. set to be their first opponent. The club ended their run in the competition with a 21–0 loss against the Leons.

Current squad

Managers
Managers by Years (2012–2015)

References

Football clubs in the Philippines
Association football clubs established in 2012
Sports in Bulacan